Whose Justice? Which Rationality? is a 1988 book of moral philosophy by the Scottish philosopher Alasdair MacIntyre. In the book, MacIntyre argues that there are a number of different and incompatible accounts of practical reasoning or rationality: those of Aristotle, Augustine, David Hume (and more broadly the "Scottish school"), and Thomas Aquinas. The differing accounts of justice that are presented by Aristotle and Hume, MacIntyre argues, are caused by the underlying differences in their conceptual schemes.

See also 
 After Virtue

References 

1988 non-fiction books
Books by Alasdair MacIntyre
English-language books
Ethics books
Philosophy books
University of Notre Dame Press books